Sheephaven Bay or Sheep Haven is a broad, shallow inlet on the north coast of County Donegal, Ireland. Bounded by the peninsulae of Rosguill, to the east and Horn Head to the west, the bay is relatively protected from the full force of the Atlantic Ocean, and has supported a vibrant herring fleet.

Etymology
The Irish name  may be a recent translation of the English name to Irish. Some older maps have referred to "Ship Haven", with Irish translation , however this form is considered incorrect.

Doe Castle 
Sheephaven Bay is home to Doe Castle, located near Creeslough, which was built in the early 16th century. The castle, which still stands, was a stronghold for the Clan Sweeney (Clan Suibhne) for 200 years.

Settlements around the bay  
Carrigart
Creeslough
Downings
Dunfanaghy
Horn Head
Marble Hill
Portnablagh

References 

Bays of County Donegal